Miyazaki Athletic Stadium is an athletic stadium in Miyazaki, Miyazaki, Japan.

External links

Football venues in Japan
Sports venues in Miyazaki Prefecture
Miyazaki (city)